Jack Dellal (2 October 1923 – 28 October 2012) was a British property investor, nicknamed "Black Jack". His company, the property group Allied Commercial Holdings, financed the purchase of Shell Mex House in 2002 and sold it in 2007. Dellal had a net worth of £4.6 billion, making him one of the richest men in England during his time.

Early life
Dellal was born in Chorlton-cum-Hardy, Manchester, to Iraqi-born Sephardic Jewish immigrants Sulman Dellal, a textile importer and Charlotte Shashoua. He was educated at Heaton Moor College, also in Manchester. Dellal worked with his father from the early age of 14, selling cloth.

Career
Dellal became a banker in the 1970s. He owned the Dalton Barton London fringe bank, which he sold to Keyser Ullman for £58 million. He set up Allied Commercial in 1974 with Stanley Van Gelder, with whom he worked for over forty years. One of their deals was the flip of central London's Bush House in 2004, which made £75.0 million within two years. He was said to have invested up to £200m in London's Dolphin Square.

Dellal's nickname, "Black Jack", was popularly said to have derived from his love of gambling.

Personal life
Through two marriages and at least one long term relationship, he had nine children, seven daughters and two sons.

Zehava Helmer: - Guy (businessman), Lorraine, Suzanne, Diane, and Gaby (film director)
Katya Douglas: - Jasmine (film director) and Rowan
Ruanne (Louw) :  Miss South Africa 1974 runner up:  - Zack and Catherine

In memory of his daughter Suzanne, Jack founded the Suzanne Dellal Centre for Dance and Theatre in Tel Aviv in 1989.

Guy was a director of Allied Commercial Holdings, who ran Allied Commercial along with his father from 1986, and took over operational ownership years before Jack died. By 2010, he was an investment partner of Robert and Vincent Tchenguiz, and an art dealer.

Death 
Dellal died in his sleep in London on 28 October 2012, aged 89.

References

1923 births
2012 deaths
Businesspeople from Manchester
British Sephardi Jews
British bankers
British billionaires
British people of Iraqi-Jewish descent
British real estate businesspeople
Mizrahi Jews
20th-century English businesspeople